Hejnum is a populated area, a socken (not to be confused with parish), on the Swedish island of Gotland. It comprises the same area as the administrative Hejnum District, established on 1January 2016.

Geography 
Hejnum is situated in the northern inland of Gotland just south of Lake Tingstäde. Central Hejnum consists of flat farmlands with forest area in the west and east. The medieval Hejnum Church is situated in the socken. , Hejnum Church belongs to Väskinde parish in Norra Gotlands pastorat, along with the churches in Väskinde, Fole, Lokrume, Bro and
Bäl.

There are four nature reserves in Hejnum: File hajdar, Hejnum hällar, Kallgatburg and Tiselhagen.

History 
One of the most magnificent medieval gate portals on Gotland, is at the Riddare farm in Hejnum.

References

External links 
Objects from Hejnum at the Digital Museum by Nordic Museum

Populated places in Gotland County